The Ruger American Pistol is a polymer-framed, semi-automatic pistol introduced by Ruger in December 2015.

Design
The pistol uses a pre-tensioned striker firing system, and is chambered in 9mm Luger and .45 ACP. The pistol uses a Browning-type locked-breech short recoil action, with a barrel cam system that is designed to reduce felt recoil. The serialized part of the pistol is a steel chassis, which is fit to a glass-filled nylon frame. The frame incorporates a Picatinny rail for mounting accessories.

Variants
In September 2016, Ruger announced compact versions of the pistol, again chambered in 9mm Luger and .45 ACP.

In March 2020, Ruger introduced the American Pistol Competition, chambered in 9mm, and the American Pistol Compact with gray Cerakote finish, chambered in .45 ACP.

References

Ruger semi-automatic pistols
9mm Parabellum semi-automatic pistols
.45 ACP semi-automatic pistols
Semi-automatic pistols of the United States
Weapons and ammunition introduced in 2015